Marie Georges Humbert (7 January 1859 Paris, France – 22 January 1921  Paris, France) was a French mathematician who worked on Kummer surfaces and the Appell–Humbert theorem and introduced Humbert surfaces. His son was the mathematician Pierre Humbert. He won the Poncelet Prize of the  Académie des Sciences in 1891.

He studied at the École Polytechnique. He was the brother-in-law of Charles Mangin.

Works
Application de la théorie des fonctions fuchsiennes à l'étude des courbes algébriques, Journal de mathematiques pure et appliquées, 4th Series, Vol. 2, 1886, pp. 239–328, Online, pdf
Pierre Humbert, Gaston Julia (Editor): Georges Humbert- Oeuvres, Gauthier-Villars 1929
Cours d'Analyse, 2 volumes, Gauthier-Villars 1902, 1904 (Lecturers given at École Polytechnique)

References

External links

19th-century French mathematicians
20th-century French mathematicians
1859 births
1921 deaths
École Polytechnique alumni
Members of the French Academy of Sciences